Waxahatchee is an American indie music project, formed in 2010 by American singer-songwriter Katie Crutchfield (born 4 January 1989), previously a member of P.S. Eliot. The band is named after Waxahatchee Creek, in Alabama, where Crutchfield grew up. Originally an acoustic solo project, her recordings now tend to involve a backing band, and the music has increasingly been performed this way. Crutchfield, as Waxahatchee, has released 5 albums to date: American Weekend (2012), Cerulean Salt (2013), Ivy Tripp (2015), Out in the Storm (2017) and Saint Cloud (2020).

History

2010–2017: American Weekend, Cerulean Salt, and Ivy Tripp
While a member of P.S. Eliot, a band formed with her twin sister Allison, Crutchfield released her first music as Waxahatchee as a cassette.  Her bedroom-recorded debut album, American Weekend, was recorded in 2011 and released on Don Giovanni Records in 2012. Crutchfield wrote and recorded the album in one week at her family home in Birmingham, Alabama. Her lyrics focused on personal relationships, devastation and longing.

The album garnered positive reviews and was named a top album of 2012 by Dusted magazine. "Be Good" was a song of the day on National Public Radio, and listed as one of the best 50 songs of 2012.  "Catfish" was featured in Welcome to Night Vale.

A second album, Cerulean Salt, was released in March 2013 on Don Giovanni Records in the United States and four months later on Wichita Recordings in the U.K. The critically acclaimed album reached #1 on the Official Record Store Chart in July 2013 and  scored 8.4 on Pitchfork.  Waxahatchee supported Tegan And Sara on their U.K. tour, before playing a headline U.K. tour in October that same year.  

Crutchfield signed to Merge Records, which released her third album, Ivy Tripp, in April 2015. Waxahatchee toured non-stop for the rest of 2015, including tours with Kurt Vile and the Violators and Sleater Kinney.

2017–present: Out in the Storm and Saint Cloud
In 2017, Waxahatchee toured with The New Pornographers, and also embarked on a headlining tour around the United States. In the autumn months they toured various parts of Europe in clubs and festivals. Waxahatchee's fourth album, Out in the Storm, was released on 14 July 2017 on Merge Records. It moves away from the lo-fi sound of previous albums, partly due to the guidance of co-producer John Agnello. It was recorded in the Miner Street Recordings studio with her former touring band. Sam Sodomsky of Pitchfork wrote of "Katie Crutchfield’s sharp, gorgeous songwriting", "immersive" band sound and "songs that play like fiery exorcisms" in a review of the album. Waxahatchee opened  Jawbreaker's first Los Angeles shows in 22 years at the Hollywood Palladium on 10 March 2018 and in New York City at Brooklyn Steel on 27 February 2018.  

In January 2020, Waxahatchee announced her 5th album Saint Cloud and released a single called "Fire". The album was recorded in 2019 at Sonic Ranch in Texas and at Long Pond in Stuyvesant, New York with producer Brad Cook. The album features Detroit-based band Bonny Doon. On 18 February she released the single "Lilacs" and on March 16 she released the single "Can't Do Much."  In a comprehensive interview  with Will Gottsegen at Billboard she spoke about her musical influences and recent sobriety.

Waxahatchee made it at No. 7 on Billboard's Emerging Artists chart of April 2020, as her fifth album, Saint Cloud, arrived at No. 1 on Heatseekers Albums, No. 2 on Americana/Folk Albums and No. 6 on Alternative Albums with 7,000 units. The single "Lilacs" same time ranked at No. 36 on the Adult Alternative Songs airplay chart.

In the first months of the COVID-19 pandemic in 2020, Crutchfield performed a series of live concert streams comprising all the songs from one of her studio albums. She announced the series as a deep dive into her backlist in an attempt to reach out to her fans and also to generate some income after the pandemic caused suspension of all touring.

In 2021, Waxahatchee was inter alia part of then Newport Folk Festival as well the Mempho Music Festival in the Radians Amphitheater of Memphis, Tennessee. Her album Saint Cloud won the Libera Awards 2021 as Best Country Record.

Waxahatchee's cover of Kevin Morby's "Downtown's Lights" was featured over the closing credits on Episode 6 "Debt Collection" of American Rust.

In July 2022, Crutchfield announced Plains, a collaboration project with singer-songwriter Jess Williamson. Their debut album, I Walked with You a Ways, was released in October 2022.

Personal life 
Katie Crutchfield has been in a relationship with songwriter Kevin Morby since 2017, and they live together in Overland Park, Kansas.

In 2017, with Morby, she published a cover of "After Hours" from the Velvet Underground's 1969 self-titled album. In January 2018, indie label Dead Oceans, published the cooperation single Farewell Transmission b/w The Dark Don't Hide It by Morby & Waxahatchee, in homage to songwriter Jason Molina. Merge Records published the digital single video Chapel of Pines, on YouTube on 17 July 2018, which led Waxahatchee back to solo work.

In interviews, Crutchfield has said that her album Saint Cloud was largely written about her decision to get sober.

Katie Crutchfield’s twin sister Allison is also a musician, performing solo and with the band Swearin'.

Discography

Studio albums

EPs

Singles
 "No Curse" (Weathervane Music's Shaking Through 2017)
 "Farewell Transmission" b/w "The Dark Don't Hide It" (Kevin Morby & Waxahatchee) (2018, Dead Oceans)
 "Live at Third Man" (2018)
 "Lilacs" (2020) #26 US AAA
 "Other Side" (with Wynonna) (2022)

Notes

Awards and nominations

References

External links

 Waxahatchee at Don Giovanni Records
 Waxahatchee at Bandcamp
 Waxahatchee at Wichita Recordings
 Waxahatchee at Merge Records

2010 establishments in Alabama
Dead Oceans artists
Don Giovanni Records artists
Indie folk groups
Indie rock musical groups from Alabama
Merge Records artists
Musical groups established in 2010
Musical groups from Birmingham, Alabama
Wichita Recordings artists